Midnight Oil are an Australian rock band, formed in 1972.

Midnight Oil may also refer to:

 Midnight Oil (Midnight Oil album), the band's 1978 eponymous debut album
 Midnight Oil (Jerome Richardson album), 1959

See also
 The Midnight Oil, a 1973 album by Barbara Mandrell
 "The Midnight Oil" (song), a song written by Joe Allen, recorded by Barbara Mandrell